Fazalhaq Farooqi (also known as Fazal Haque), was born 22 September 2000 and is an Afghan international cricketer who plays for the Afghanistan national cricket team in all formats of the game. Fazalhaq made his international debut for the Afghanistan cricket team in March 2021. In franchise leagues, he plays for Sunrisers Hyderabad in the Indian Premier League (IPL), Dhaka Dominators in the Bangladesh Premier League (BPL), and Islamabad United in the Pakistan Super League (PSL).

Career
Fazalhaq made his first-class debut for Amo Region in the 2017–18 Ahmad Shah Abdali 4-day Tournament on 13 November 2017. He made his List A debut for Amo Region in the 2018 Ghazi Amanullah Khan Regional One Day Tournament on 10 July 2018.

In September 2018, he was named in Nangarhar's squad in the first edition of the Afghanistan Premier League tournament. In December 2018, he was named in Afghanistan's under-23 team for the 2018 ACC Emerging Teams Asia Cup. He made his Twenty20 debut on 14 October 2019, for Boost Defenders in the 2019 Shpageeza Cricket League.

In December 2019, he was named in Afghanistan's squad for the 2020 Under-19 Cricket World Cup. In February 2021, he was named in Afghanistan's Test squad for their series against Zimbabwe. The following month, he was named in Afghanistan's Twenty20 International (T20I) squad, also for their series against Zimbabwe. He made his T20I debut for Afghanistan, against Zimbabwe, on 20 March 2021. Later the same month, Chennai Super Kings included Fazalhaq as a net bowler in their squad for 2021 Indian Premier League. Farooqi also served as Kings XI Punjab's net bowler in the 2020 edition of the Indian Premier League.

In July 2021, Fazalhaq was named in Afghanistan's One Day International (ODI) squad for their series against Pakistan. In January 2022, he was named in Afghanistan's ODI squad for their series against the Netherlands in Qatar. He made his ODI debut on 25 January 2022, for Afghanistan against the Netherlands.

In February 2022, he was bought by the Sunrisers Hyderabad in the auction for the 2022 Indian Premier League tournament. In July 2022, he was signed by the Colombo Stars for the third edition of the Lanka Premier League. On 23 December 2022, the Sydney Thunder terminated his contract following an investigation by Cricket Australia into a behavioral incident involving Fazalhaq, which occurred on 15 December 2022 and involved alleged harassment of female cricketing staff.

Player Profiles & Statistics

First Post - https://www.firstpost.com/firstcricket/player-profile/fazal-haque-67927 

Cricketpedia - https://www.cricketpedia.in/en/player/fazal-haque-2201/ipl

References

External links
 

2000 births
Living people
Afghan cricketers
Afghanistan One Day International cricketers
Afghanistan Twenty20 International cricketers
Amo Sharks cricketers
Nangarhar Leopards cricketers
Sunrisers Hyderabad cricketers
Place of birth missing (living people)